Two ships named Ponsborne served as East Indiamen for the British East India Company (EIC):
 made four voyages for the EIC before her owners sold her in 1775 to Portuguese owners then sailed her between Lisbon and Goa.
 made six voyages for the EIC before she was wrecked in 1796 after having landed troops at Grenada.

Ship names